The elimination phase of the 2013 Copa Sudamericana was played from July 30 to September 5, 2013. A total of 46 teams competed in the elimination phase.

Draw
The draw of the tournament was held on July 3, 2013, 12:00 UTC−3, at the Sheraton Hotel in Buenos Aires, Argentina.

Excluding the defending champion (entering in the round of 16), the other 46 teams were divided into four zones:
South Zone: Teams from Bolivia, Chile, Paraguay, and Uruguay (entering in the first stage)
North Zone: Teams from Colombia, Ecuador, Peru, and Venezuela (entering in the first stage)
Argentina Zone: Teams from Argentina (entering in the second stage)
Brazil Zone: Teams from Brazil (entering in the second stage)

The draw mechanism was as follows:
South Zone and North Zone:
For the first stage, the 16 teams from the South Zone were drawn into eight ties, and the 16 teams from the North Zone were drawn into the other eight ties. Teams which qualified for berths 1 were drawn against teams which qualified for berths 4, and teams which qualified for berths 2 were drawn against teams which qualified for berths 3, with the former hosting the second leg in both cases. Teams from the same association could not be drawn into the same tie.
For the second stage, the 16 winners of the first stage were drawn into eight ties. The eight winners from the South Zone were drawn against the eight winners from the North Zone, with the former hosting the second leg in four ties, and the latter hosting the second leg in the other four ties.
Argentina Zone: The six teams were drawn into three ties. Teams which qualified for berths 1–3 were drawn against teams which qualified for berths 4–6, with the former hosting the second leg.
Brazil Zone: The eight teams were split into four ties. No draw was held, where the matchups were based on the berths which the teams qualified for: 1 vs. 8, 2 vs. 7, 3 vs. 6, 4 vs. 5, with the former hosting the second leg.

Seeding
The following was the seeding of the 46 teams entered into the first stage and second stage draw:

Format
In the elimination phase, each tie was played on a home-and-away two-legged basis. If tied on aggregate, the away goals rule was used. If still tied, the penalty shoot-out was used to determine the winner (no extra time is played). The 15 winners of the second stage (three from Argentina Zone, four from Brazil Zone, eight from ties between South Zone and North Zone) advanced to the round of 16 to join the defending champion (São Paulo).

First stage
The first legs were played on July 30–August 1, and the second legs were played on August 6–8, 2013.

A minute of silence was held in honor to the passing of Ecuadorian player Christian Benítez at all first leg games of the first stage.

|-
!colspan=6|South Zone

|-
!colspan=6|North Zone

|}

Match G1

Libertad won 2–1 on aggregate.

Match G2

Cobreloa won 2–0 on aggregate.

Match G3

Universidad de Chile won 6–3 on aggregate.

Match G4

Guaraní won 4–1 on aggregate.

Match G5

Colo Colo won 3–0 on aggregate.

Match G6

River Plate won 5–0 on aggregate.

Match G7

Universidad Católica won 2–1 on aggregate.

Match G8

Tied 1–1 on aggregate, Nacional won on away goals.

Match G9

Atlético Nacional won 5–0 on aggregate.

Match G10

Mineros won 4–2 on aggregate.

Match G11

Independiente del Valle won 2–0 on aggregate.

Match G12

Itagüí won 6–2 on aggregate.

Match G13

Emelec won 7–1 on aggregate.

Match G14

Deportivo Pasto won 3–2 on aggregate.

Match G15

La Equidad won 1–0 on aggregate.

Match G16

LDU Loja won 3–1 on aggregate.

Second stage
The first legs were played on August 13–14 and 20–22, and the second legs were played on August 27–29 and September 5, 2013.

A minute of silence was held in honor to the passing of two-time World Cup-winning Brazilian player Gilmar at all second leg games of the second stage.

|}

Match O1

Universidad Católica won 7–2 on aggregate.

Match O2

River Plate won 1–0 on aggregate.

Match O3

Deportivo Pasto won 3–0 on aggregate.

Match O4

Tied 2–2 on aggregate, Sport Recife won on penalties.

Match O5

Itagüí won 1–0 on aggregate.

Match O6

Vélez Sarsfield won 2–1 on aggregate.

Match O7

Universidad de Chile won 4–2 on aggregate.

Match O8

Bahia won 2–1 on aggregate.

Match O9

Atlético Nacional won 2–0 on aggregate.

Match O10

Lanús won 4–1 on aggregate.

Match O11

Tied 1–1 on aggregate, La Equidad won on away goals.

Match O12

Tied 1–1 on aggregate, Coritiba won on penalties.

Match O13

Libertad won 4–1 on aggregate.

Match O14

Ponte Preta won 2–1 on aggregate.

Match O15

LDU Loja won 1–0 on aggregate.

References

External links
 
Copa Sudamericana, CONMEBOL.com 

1